Bernard Mulgrew from the University of Edinburgh, Edinburgh, Scotland was named Fellow of the Institute of Electrical and Electronics Engineers (IEEE) in 2012 for contributions to linear and nonlinear equalizers for adaptive systems.

References

Fellow Members of the IEEE
Living people
Year of birth missing (living people)
Place of birth missing (living people)
Academics of the University of Edinburgh